Antispila oinophylla is a species of moth of the family Heliozelidae. It is found in North America, including Ontario, Quebec, Connecticut, Georgia, Kentucky, New York, Tennessee and Vermont. Records under Antispila ampelopsifoliella from Maine, Missouri and Ohio may also partly refer to this species. In Europe, it is introduced into northern Italy.

In North America, larvae have been found feeding on Vitis aestivalis (var. aestivalis and var. bicolor), Vitis labrusca, Vitis riparia and Vitis vulpina. In Italy, mines were found on various Vitis vinifera cultivars, hybrids and French-American grapes. A preference for some grape cultivars (e.g. Cabernet Sauvignon, Chardonnay, Muscat) is suggested from observations carried out in mixed cultivar vineyards. Active mines were also found on Parthenocissus quinquefolia. The larvae mine the leaves of their host plant. The mine starts as a rather straight or slightly contorted gallery towards the vein, usually forming a right angle and often following the vein for a short distance. It then again turns away from the vein where it expands into a blotch. The gallery portion, of variable length, is usually later incorporated into the blotch mine. The frass is linear, usually occupies the complete mine width, but occasionally is deposited in a thin line. In the blotch much of the blackish-brown frass is deposited close to the origin in semicircular concentric frass lines.

Etymology
The epithet oinophylla is derived from the Greek oinos (meaning wine) and phyllon (meaning leaf) and refers to the larvae that live in the leaves of the grapevine from which wine is made.

Male genitalia

Gallery

References

Moths described in 2012
Heliozelidae
Moths of Europe